Huguang Huiguan (aka Huguang Guild Hall, Lianghu Guild Hall, and Yu King Palace,) is a guild hall (or assembly hall) in the Yuzhong District of Chongqing, China, on the Yangtze River.

The Huguang Guild Hall was established in 1759, during the reign of the Qianlong Emperor in the Qing Dynasty. It consists of a complex of courtyards, gardens, halls, meeting rooms, and theaters that acted as a regional center for business, entertainment, religious, and social activities.

Huguang Huiguan is now a museum. Yuwang Temple, Guangdong House (aka Nanhua Palace), Qi’an House, and the Jiangxi Guild Hall are located within the complex.

See also
 Huguang Guild Hall, Beijing
 List of Major National Historical and Cultural Sites in Chongqing

References

External links
 

1759 establishments in China
Major National Historical and Cultural Sites in Chongqing
Museums in Chongqing
Theatre museums in China